Omicrabulus is an Afrotropical genus of potter wasps.

Species
The following species are placed in the genus Omicrabulus:

 Omicrabulus admonitor Giordani Soika, 1989
 Omicrabulus arabicus Gusenleitner, 2002
 Omicrabulus baidoensis Giordani Soika, 1989
 Omicrabulus punctatissimus Gusenleitner, 2000
 Omicrabulus saganensis (Giordani Soika, 1944)
 Omicrabulus triangularis (Giordani Soika, 1944)

References

Hymenoptera genera
Potter wasps